Disco 2 is the second remix album by English synth-pop duo Pet Shop Boys, released on 12 September 1994 by Parlophone. It consists of remixes of songs from the duo's albums Behaviour (1990) and Very (1993), as well as B-sides from the time.

Background and composition
The tracks on the CD were mixed into one long continuous megamix by DJ Danny Rampling. As a result, most of the tracks are in edited versions, having been cut off mid-way through in a crossfade into the following tracks (as a DJ might do while mixing music live). Some of the tracks were reduced by more than half of their original lengths in this way. In addition, some tracks were sped up or slowed down, in order to match the overall tempo of the mix.

A limited edition of the album was released in the United States which contained a second CD with B-sides and additional mixes.

Track listing
"Absolutely Fabulous" (Rollo Our Tribe Tongue-In Cheek Mix) – 0:29
"I Wouldn't Normally Do This Kind of Thing" (Beatmasters Extended Nude Mix) – 4:15
"I Wouldn't Normally Do This Kind of Thing" (DJ Pierre Wild Pitch Mix) – 2:59
"Go West" (Heller & Farley Project Mix) – 3:40
"Liberation" (E Smoove 12" Mix) – 6:09
"So Hard" (Morales Red Zone Mix) – 2:48
"Can You Forgive Her?" (Rollo Dub) – 4:03
"Yesterday, When I Was Mad" (Junior Vasquez Fabulous Dub) – 4:54
"Absolutely Fabulous" (Rollo Our Tribe Tongue-In Cheek Mix) – 6:01
"Yesterday, When I Was Mad" (Coconut 1 12" Mix) – 2:12
"Yesterday, When I Was Mad" (Jam & Spoon Mix) – 5:01
"We All Feel Better in the Dark" (Brothers in Rhythm After Hours Climax Mix) – 5:21 *Mislabeled. This is actually the Ambient Mix

US limited edition bonus CD
"Decadence" – 3:55
"Some Speculation" – 6:33
"Euroboy" – 4:28
"Yesterday, When I Was Mad" (RAF Zone Dub Mix) – 5:37
"I Wouldn't Normally Do This Kind of Thing" (7" Mix) – 4:45

Charts

Sales

|}

References

1994 remix albums
Parlophone remix albums
Pet Shop Boys remix albums
Sequel albums